Sclerophrys djohongensis is a species of toad in the family Bufonidae. It is endemic to the Adamawa Plateau in north-central  Cameroon. It was originally described as a subspecies of Bufo funereus (now Sclerophrys funerea). It might even be a junior synonym of Sclerophrys villiersi.

The species' natural habitats are gallery forests in montane grassland and wooded savanna landscapes. A rarely recorded species, it probably suffers from habitat degradation caused by agriculture, overgrazing by livestock, wood extraction, fire, and human settlements.

References

djohongensis
Frogs of Africa
Amphibians of Cameroon
Endemic fauna of Cameroon
Amphibians described in 1977
Taxonomy articles created by Polbot